This article lists the Labour Party's election results from the 1945 United Kingdom general election until 1955, including by-elections.

All candidates were sponsored, in some cases by the Divisional Labour Party (noted as "Constituency").

Summary of general election performance

Sponsorship of candidates

Election results

1945 UK general election

By-elections, 1945-1950

1950 UK general election

By-elections, 1950-1951

1951 UK general election

By-elections, 1951-1955

References

Election results by party in the United Kingdom
Results 1945